Cunning Stunts is a Spoonerism. It may refer to:

Cunning Stunts (Caravan album), 1975
Cunning Stunts (Cows album), 1992
Cunning Stunts (video), a 1998 concert video by Metallica
 Cunning Stunts (Goodies episode)
 Cunning Stunts (1970s feminist theatre company)
 Cunning Stunts, a 2017 downloadable update for Grand Theft Auto Online